KHHT (98.9 MHz, Old School 98.9) is an FM radio station broadcasting out of Mettler, California. It is licensed to Point Five LLC.

KHHT carries Point Five's Old School Network as they do on KOCP.

History

KHHT began broadcasting on March 5, 2015.

References

External links

Mass media in Kern County, California
Radio stations established in 2016
HHT (FM)
2016 establishments in California
EBT